Yago Henrique Severino dos Santos (born 7 July 1995), simply known as Yago, is a Brazilian professional footballer who plays as a defensive midfielder for Centro Sportivo Alagoano.

Honours
Atlético Mineiro
Campeonato Mineiro: 2017

References

External links

1995 births
Living people
Footballers from Belo Horizonte
Brazilian footballers
Association football midfielders
Campeonato Brasileiro Série A players
Campeonato Brasileiro Série B players
Saudi Professional League players
Clube Atlético Mineiro players
Al-Qadsiah FC players
Sport Club do Recife players
Centro Sportivo Alagoano players
Esporte Clube Juventude players
Associação Atlética Ponte Preta players
Brazilian expatriate footballers
Brazilian expatriate sportspeople in Saudi Arabia
Expatriate footballers in Saudi Arabia